Townsend & Wall (officially known as Townsend, Wyatt and Wall) at 602 Francis Street was the principal department store in downtown St. Joseph, Missouri from 1866 to 1983. It is listed as a contributing building to the St. Joseph Commerce and Banking Historic District which is on the National Register of Historic Places.  It is also a prominent building in the Historic Retail District Felix Street Corridor in the master plan for St. Joseph

Designed by Walter Boschen the five story building is now used for apartments. The store was founded in 1866 by John Townsend, who was born in Illinois, started his career as a clerk in the store of John and Isaac Curd on Main street. The first store was at 403 Felix street under the firm name of Townsend & Lowell.  After Lowell retired in 1868 the store under the new name Townsend & Wood moved to 319 Felix street. In 1879 it became Townsend, Wyatt & Co. after he took on new partners J. Cavan Wyatt and John D. Richardson, Jr.

In 1890 it joined with Emery Dry Goods Co. under the name of Townsend, Wyatt & Emery Dry Goods Co. and was at Sixth and Edmond before being destroyed by fire in September, 1893. Wyatt died in 1911.  In 1914, the name was again changed to Townsend, Wyatt and Wall to accommodate the addition of Thomas R. Wall.

External links
Winding River reprint of 1916 brochure
MHDC history

Defunct department stores based in Missouri
Buildings and structures in St. Joseph, Missouri
Commercial buildings in Missouri
Department stores on the National Register of Historic Places
Commercial buildings on the National Register of Historic Places in Missouri
National Register of Historic Places in Buchanan County, Missouri